The 2010 Harlequins Rugby League season was the thirty-first in the club's history and their fifteenth season in the Super League. The club was coached by Brian McDermott, competing in Super League XV, finishing in 13th place and reaching the Fifth round of the 2010 Challenge Cup.

Harlequins RL entered their 5th year under the Harlequins name after being previously known as the London Broncos, London Crusaders and Fulham RLFC.

Super League XV table

Results and fixtures

Super League XV

Round 3
Harlequins10–18 Wakefield Trinity Wildcats

Quins season got off to a disappointing start with defeat to Wakefield at home in a scrappy, penalty-ridden game. Daryl Millard put the away side in the lead on the 12th minute, but Ben Jones-Bishop got Quins back in the game with an unconverted score. The game continued its "you score, we score" pattern as Ben Jeffries and Jones-Bishop exchanged scores, but it was up to young winger Aaron Murphy to settle matters in the 56th minute. Both sides ended the game with 12 men as Louis McCarthy-Scarsbrook and Richard Moore were sent off for fighting.

2010 squad

References

External links
London Broncos - Rugby League Project

London Broncos seasons
Harlequins Rugby League season
Harlequins Rugby League season